Varnava Rosić was the Patriarch of the Serbian Orthodox Church from 1930 to 1937. He was born Petar Rosić in Pljevlja, belonging at that time to the Ottoman Empire, on August 29, 1880.

Life
Since Metropolitan Parthenios of Debar, and Veles (1907-1913) was frequently absent from his eparchy serving as a member of Holy Synod in Constantinople, it was decided that an auxiliary bishop should be appointed for administration of the eparchy. By that time, Varnava Rosić was serving as a Serbian Orthodox priest in Constantinople and he was chosen and consecrated as bishop on 10 April 1910 in the Patriarchal Church of Saint George. As an auxiliary bishop serving in the Eparchy of Debar and Veles, he welcomed the liberation of that region from Turkish rule in 1912 and annexation to the Kingdom of Serbia. Metropolitan Parthenios was finally transferred to another eparchy in 1913, and bishop Varnava was left in charge not only in the Eparchy of Debar and Veles since the administration of other ecclesiastical territories annexed to the Kingdom of Serbia was also entrusted to him.

During First World War, upon the Bulgarian occupation of southern parts of Kingdom of Serbia in 1915, he had to leave his eparchy, returning after liberation in 1918. In 1920, he was elected Metropolitan of Skopje and served in that eparchy until 1930, when he became a new Serbian Patriarch.

During the office of Varnava, the dioceses of Zagreb and Mukacheve was formed. Between 1931 and 1937, the Serbian Church consisted of 27 dioceses and a vicariate in Skadar, Albania. Church life was on the move in all regions. Many monasteries, churches and church buildings were erected, some of these being the present Patriarchate building in Belgrade, Vavedenje Monastery, etc. The construction of the edifice of the great Temple of Saint Sava was initiated in Belgrade (one of the largest churches in the world).
                                                
Varnava firmly resisted the introduction of legislation giving greater privileges to the Roman Catholic Church not in Yugoslavia in general, but in Serbia in particular (hence The Concordat Crisis). He maintained that these would certainly undermine the positions of both the Serbian Orthodox Church and those of other faiths in the country. He died unexpectedly during the night between July 23–24, 1937 when the Concordat legislation was carried into Parliament. The Holy Synod was also against government pro-Concordat policy, and the government was soon forced to withdraw this new legislation.

It is believed that Patriarch Varnava was poisoned because of his struggle against Concordat, and his death is still unresolved.

He was the great-uncle of performance artist Marina Abramović.

Patriarch Varnava was awarded Order of the White Eagle and a number of other decorations.

See also 
 List of 20th-century religious leaders

References

Sources

External links
 Prayerful remembrance of Patriarch Varnava Rosić
 

1880 births
1937 deaths
People from Pljevlja
Serbs of Montenegro
Varnava I
Serbian Orthodox metropolitans of Skopje
20th-century Eastern Orthodox bishops
Burials at Serbian Orthodox monasteries and churches